Kitara can refer to:

 Kitara, the nickname for the Sapporo Concert Hall.
 Empire of Kitara, an East African empire founded by the dynasty of the Bachwezi.
 Kingdom of Bunyoro-Kitara, an East African kingdom founded by the dynasty of the  Babiito.
 Kithara (musical instrument), ancient Greek lyre.
 Kithara (Harry Partch), a third-bridge zither created by Harry Partch.
 Misa Kitara, a guitar-shaped touchpad MIDI controller and musical instrument.
 Runyakitara, a standardized language in Uganda.